Marek Papszun (born 8 August 1974) is a Polish professional football manager who is currently in charge of Ekstraklasa club Raków Częstochowa.

Career
In 2010, Papszun was appointed manager of Polish sixth division side KS Łomianki, helping them achieve promotion to the Polish fifth division. In 2011, he was appointed manager of Legionovia Legionowo in the Polish fourth division, helping them achieve promotion to the Polish third division. In 2016, he was appointed manager of Polish third division club Raków Częstochowa, helping them achieve promotion to the Polish Ekstraklasa within 3 seasons and receiving interest from Legia, the most successful club in Poland.

Raków Częstochowa led by Marek Papszun won its first major trophy on 2 May 2021, defeating Arka Gdynia in the final of the Polish Cup by a score of 2–1. The win also secured them a place in the newly formed UEFA Europa Conference League for the 2021–22 season, their maiden appearance in European football. In the same season, Papszun's Raków finished in second place in the Ekstraklasa standings, club's highest ever league position. After the season, he was announced the Ekstraklasa Coach of the Year. On 2 May 2022, Raków defeated Lech Poznań 3–1 and secured its second consecutive Polish Cup. On 9 July 2022 he led Raków to their second consecutive Polish Super Cup with a 2–0 win over Lech Poznań.

Honours

Manager 
Raków Częstochowa
 Polish Cup: 2020–21, 2021–22
 Polish Super Cup: 2021, 2022
 I liga: 2018–19
 II liga: 2016–17

Individual
 Polish Coach of the Year: 2020
 Ekstraklasa Coach of the Year: 2020–21

References

External links
 

1974 births
Living people
Sportspeople from Warsaw
Polish football managers
Ząbkovia Ząbki managers
Legionovia Legionowo managers
Świt Nowy Dwór Mazowiecki managers
Raków Częstochowa managers
Ekstraklasa managers
I liga managers
II liga managers